Mickael 'Mike' Pereira Moura (born 1 October 1989) is a professional footballer who plays for F.C. Felgueiras 1932 as a right-back.

Club career
Born to Portuguese parents in Grenoble, France, Moura started playing football already in Portugal, with lowly AD Fafe, helping it achieve promotion to the third division in 2010. During his spell with the club, he majored in sociology at the University of Minho.

In the summer of 2013, Moura signed for C.D. Santa Clara. He made his debut as a professional on 11 August, playing the full 90 minutes in a 0–1 home loss against G.D. Chaves in the Segunda Liga. After impressive displays for the Azores side during the month of October, he was voted Young Player of the Month.

Moura continued competing in the second tier the following years, representing Chaves, S.C. Covilhã, Académica de Coimbra and U.D. Vilafranquense.

References

External links

1989 births
Living people
French people of Portuguese descent
Sportspeople from Grenoble
Portuguese footballers
Footballers from Auvergne-Rhône-Alpes
Association football defenders
Liga Portugal 2 players
Segunda Divisão players
AD Fafe players
C.D. Santa Clara players
G.D. Chaves players
S.C. Covilhã players
Associação Académica de Coimbra – O.A.F. players
U.D. Vilafranquense players
F.C. Felgueiras 1932 players
University of Minho alumni